The baritone guitar is a guitar with a longer scale length, typically a larger body, and heavier internal bracing, so it can be tuned to a lower pitch. Gretsch, Fender, Gibson, Ibanez, ESP Guitars, PRS Guitars, Music Man, Danelectro, Schecter, Jerry Jones Guitars, Burns London and many other companies have produced electric baritone guitars since the 1960s, although always in small numbers due to low popularity. Tacoma, Santa Cruz, Taylor, Martin, Alvarez Guitars and others have made acoustic baritone guitars.

Use
The baritone-tuned guitar was uncommon until the Danelectro Company introduced an electric baritone guitar in the late 1950s. The electric baritone found some popularity in surf music and film scores, particularly "spaghetti Westerns." "Tic-tac bass" is a method of playing, in which a muted baritone guitar doubles the part played by the bass guitar or double bass. The method is commonly used in country music.

Tuning and string gauges
A standard guitar's standard tuning (from lowest–pitched string to highest) is E2–A2–D3–G3–B3–E4. While no standard tuning has been established for baritone guitars, popular tunings for the instrument are: a perfect fourth lower than a standard guitar (B1–E2–A2–D3–F3–B3), a perfect fifth lower (A1–D2–G2–C3–E3–A3), or a major third lower (C2–F2–B2–E3–G3–C4). Typically strung with 13 gauge (.013–.062), or 14 gauge (.014–.068) baritone guitar strings. 12 gauge (.012–.060) guitar strings can also be used.

Baritone acoustic guitars typically have larger bodies than standard guitars, and have longer scale lengths so the strings can be tuned lower while remaining at normal tension. On a standard guitar, the scale length (the distance from the nut to the saddle on the bridge) is typically .

Baritone guitarists

1960s early adopters

In the 1960s, it was often tuned an octave down from standard guitar tuning; therefore, these recordings used a retuned baritone guitar as a six-string bass.
The Danelectro baritone was used by guitarist Duane Eddy in numerous recordings, including "Bonnie Came Back", "Because They're Young", "Kommotion", "My Blue Heaven", "Deep in the Heart of Texas", and "The Son of Rebel Rouser". The instrument was used almost exclusively on his best-selling 1960 album "The Twang's the Thang" and appears regularly on singles and albums throughout his career. The "twangy" sound of his guitars (which include Duane Eddy custom-builts by Guild, Gretsch and Gibson) augmented the even deeper twangy sound made by the Danelectro baritone. Eddy used the familiar black model and an unusual gray "Longhorn" model.

Brian Wilson often included baritone guitars in his arrangements for The Beach Boys records, such as in "Dance, Dance, Dance" (1964) or "Caroline, No" (1966).

Singer Jimmie Rodgers also favored the baritone guitar, which can be heard in the opening bars of his recording of "Woman from Liberia" (1960).

Singer Glen Campbell used a baritone electric guitar on several of his big hit songs, most notably "Wichita Lineman" and "Galveston", where he played a distinctive baritone solo following the melody in both songs.

In heavy metal
Baritone guitars became popular in heavy metal music during the late 1980s, as it became increasingly popular to employ lower guitar tunings and dropped tunings. Early examples include Carcass (using B standard) and Bolt Thrower (using A standard on Realm of Chaos). 
Pat O'Brien formerly of the band Cannibal Corpse has a baritone guitar to allow him to use the tuning G without experiencing tuning problems because of his use of a Floyd Rose tremolo.
Dylan Carlson of drone metal band Earth played a baritone guitar on Hex (Or Printing in the Infernal Method). 
Machine Head uses baritone guitars tuned to drop B and C standard (tuned 40 cents sharp (roughly A450)). Robb Flynn, singer and guitarist from the band, has a signature Epiphone Baritone Flying V model called "Love Death".
Brian 'Head' Welch of Korn uses Ibanez baritone guitars on his solo album Save Me From Myself.
Dino Cazares of Fear Factory used both seven-string and eight-string Ibanez baritone guitars on Genexus.
John Petrucci of the band Dream Theater has used Music Man baritone guitars on several songs, in the tunings A and B.
James Hetfield of Metallica uses his signature ESP baritone guitar "The Grynch" on the song "Invisible Kid" from the 2003 Metallica album St. Anger, and occasionally uses it when the band plays songs from the album.
Claudio Sanchez of Coheed and Cambria uses a Gibson Explorer baritone for "Key Entity Extraction II: Hollywood The Cracked" from the band's album The Afterman: Ascension and "Key Entity Extraction V: Sentry The Defiant" from the album The Afterman: Descension.
Devin Townsend of the Devin Townsend Project and Strapping Young Lad often uses baritone guitars due to his preference for open B and C tunings. His specific instruments are ESP Custom 7 string used in Strapping Young Lad, his Peavey signature Flying V, and the "Ziltoid" Flying V built by Framus.
Stephen Carpenter of Deftones began using baritone 7-strings in 2002, due to his constant exploration in down-tuning. While previous albums were recorded with standard-scaled 6-strings tuned to as low as drop C, their 2003 self-titled album was recorded with a baritone 7-string tuned to G.
Other baritone 7-string artists include Jeff Loomis of Nevermore, who has used baritone Schecters since 2002 and currently has several signature models. The deathcore band Whitechapel has recently made use of baritone guitars, and have released signature models with ESP that feature baritone scale lengths. Loathe also uses baritone 6 string guitars, tuned to an octave below E standard.
Josh Middleton and Adam Christianson of progressive metalcore band Architects use baritone 6 string ESP, Ibanez, LSL and Mayones guitars, tuned to a variation of C standard, where the bottom string is tuned to either G or F. This tuning was first utilised by late guitarist and co-founder of the band, Tom Searle, with the G tuning making its first appearance on the 2009 album Hollow Crown, and the F tuning first appearing on the 2014 album Lost Forever // Lost Together. Both tunings are still used by the band in their newer music.
Tracy G Used a custom-made baritone guitar on Dio's 1996 release Angry Machines. He continues to use the baritone guitar on all his releases.
Roman Ibramkhalilov of Jinjer use custom OD baritone guitars since 2015, with the album "King of Everything" and in their most famous track and internet react phenomenon, "Pisces".

In other rock
Rock guitarists also use down-tuned guitars. Benjamin Burnley, the guitarist/singer from Breaking Benjamin, uses custom-built PRS and ESP baritone guitars for their songs in Drop A tuning.  Ko Melina of The Dirtbombs plays a Fender Jaguar Baritone Custom. Teppei Teranishi of Thrice plays a baritone on the "Fire" disc of The Alchemy Index and Major/Minor. Ian Mackaye plays a baritone guitar when playing with his band The Evens. Aerosmith's Joe Perry plays a six-string Fender VI bass tuned in G (which was later stolen) on "Back in the Saddle" on the 1976 Rocks album, and currently uses a Music Man Silo Baritone.

Eddie Van Halen used a baritone guitar on the songs "Spanked" And "Runaround" from Van Halen's 1991 album For Unlawful Carnal Knowledge. His specific guitar was a double-necked Ernie Ball EVH Music Man (the top neck being the baritone), which can be seen in music videos and live performances.

Pete Loeffler, the guitarist/singer from Chevelle, uses a custom built PRS baritone and Fender Sub-Sonic baritone guitar for their songs in drop B tuning.

Mike Mushok of the  band Staind has a signature model baritone guitar manufactured by PRS Guitars. Prior to his PRS signature model, Mushok had a signature baritone guitar produced by Ibanez called the MMM1, and had a custom built fanned-fret baritone made by Novax called the Expression.

Dave Matthews plays a baritone on certain songs such as "The Space Between" and "Some Devil". Parker Lauzon of Evans Blue uses an Ibanez.

Irish blues rock artist Hozier utilizes a baritone guitar in the song 'Jackie and Wilson' and on the hit single 'Take Me To Church'

Robert Smith of The Cure has made The Fender Bass VI (which is actually a 30″ short-scale six-string bass) a major component of his dark and atmospheric tone since 1989's Disintegration, using a 1962 model. Schecter guitars have since produced a Robert Smith signature model bass VI guitar; the Ultracure VI. While many mistake these for Baritone guitars they are not. The tuning on a bass VI is one octave lower than standard guitar tuning whereas a baritone tuning varies and is often an A, B or similar alternative tuning. 

English musician Alex Turner of the band Arctic Monkeys has played the baritone guitar on their song "If You Were There, Beware", most songs from their sixth album, Tranquility Base Hotel & Casino, and a number of songs in concert with The Last Shadow Puppets.

Pat Smear has played baritone guitar since 2011 with the Foo Fighters.  Andy Moor and Terrie Hessels of The Ex have traded off between baritone guitar and guitar since 2005, when the last bass player left their band.

Emma Ruth Rundle uses a Fender Jaguar Baritone.

Jesse Hughes of Eagles of Death Metal opted for a baritone guitar on many of the songs on their 2015 album Zipper Down.

In jazz
Jazz guitarist Pat Metheny used baritone guitars made by Linda Manzer on his 2003 solo album One Quiet Night and his 2011 solo album What's It All About. Ani DiFranco often plays a baritone guitar, including those by Alvarez, frequently employing alternate tunings. Clifton Hyde has had his acoustic baritone guitar featured in the music of Sigur Rós, Gato Loco, and Pape Armond Boye. Bob Lanzetti, guitarist for the modern fusion band Snarky Puppy, frequently employs an electric baritone guitar as well. Allan Holdsworth used baritone guitars built by luthier Bill DeLap.

Mark Lettieri, solo artist and guitarist with Snarky Puppy, released two funk/fusion albums centered around the baritone guitar: Deep: The Baritone Sessions and Deep: The Baritone Sessions, Vol. 2 in 2019 and 2021, respectively, the latter of which also received a Grammy nomination for Best Contemporary Instrumental Album at the 2022 Grammy Awards. Lettieri also utilizes a baritone guitar with Vulfpeck side project, The Fearless Flyers.

Fingerstyle players and others 
Numerous fingerstyle guitarists use baritone guitars, including Andy McKee, Don Ross, Martin Simpson, Sergio Altamura, Iain Micah Weigert, and Dave Amato. Don Ross plays a baritone by Canadian Luthier Marc Beneteau, and Simpson has played baritones made by English luthier Ralph Bown. Andy McKee plays a baritone guitar made by another Canadian Luthier Michael Greenfield. Brian Setzer played the Gretsch/TV Jones Spectra-Sonic baritone on the song "Mystery Train" during the Brian Setzer Orchestra tour.

Blues band MonkeyJunk features a baritone guitar instead of a bass guitar.

Australian musician Stu Thomas plays a Barracuda baritone guitar by Burns London, tuned an octave lower than a regular guitar. He uses it as a bass when playing with Dave Graney & The mistLY, and as a "regular" guitar when he accompanies himself solo as The Stu Thomas Paradox.

Dave Gonzalez started playing a baritone with The Hacienda Brothers, consisting of a Fender Bass VI neck on a Fender Jazzmaster.

YouTube guitarist Sungha Jung plays original and cover instrumentals on Lakewood Acoustic Baritone Guitars.

Guitarist Brian Patrick Carroll aka Buckethead plays a baritone signature model Gibson Les Paul.

Phoebe Bridgers plays a Danelectro baritone model.

Producer and multi-instrumentalist Bibio has utilised baritone guitars.

See also
Bass guitar
Chiterra sarda
Eight-string guitar
Extended-range bass
Seven-string guitar
Tenor guitar

References

Guitar family instruments
Nonstandard-guitar tunings
Nonstandard guitars